Al-ʿAbbās ibn al-Ḥasan al-Jarjarāʾī was a senior Abbasid official and vizier from October 904 until his murder on 17 December 908.

As his nisba shows, he came from the locality of Jarjaraya, south of Baghdad. He began his career as private secretary to al-Qasim ibn Ubayd Allah. When al-Qasim died in October 904, he recommended either Abbas or the Jarrahid Ali Ibn Isa as his successor; when the latter declined, Caliph al-Muktafi (reigned 902–908) duly appointed Abbas to the post. His tenure of office was marked by a close alliance with the Banu'l-Furat, whose leader Abu'l-Hasan Ali became his chief aide and designated successor.

When al-Muktafi died in 908, it fell on Abbas and the senior bureaucrats to decide on his successor. In the end, Abbas heeded the advice of Abu'l-Hasan Ali, who counselled the selection of a weak ruler who would be easy to manipulate: al-Muktafi's 13-year-old brother Ja'far, who became Caliph al-Muqtadir (r. 908–932). In December 908, a palace revolt broke out led by the Jarrahids and the Hamdanid al-Husayn ibn Hamdan, aiming to install his more mature and experienced uncle, Abdallah ibn al-Mu'tazz, in his stead. The revolt ultimately failed, but not before the rebels managed to kill Abbas.

References

Sources
 
 
 

9th-century births
908 deaths
10th-century Arabs
Viziers of the Abbasid Caliphate
Assassinated politicians
10th-century people from the Abbasid Caliphate